The Berlin Immigration Office (German: , or LEA) replaced the former  in 2020. It still serves as Berlin's  ("foreigners' agency"), and Germany's largest, with 540 staff and 400,000 clients per year. The Berlin Immigration Office is under the stewardship of the Berlin .

Foundation 

The 2020 reordering gave the Ausländerbehörde independent status as a state-level , a first among Germany's 16 states. Apart from the former Ausländerbehörde, the Berlin Immigration Office also comprises some staff members who formerly worked for the LABO. An opening ceremony took place on 15 January 2020.

The restructuring was decided in 2019 by the 2016-2021 red-green-red Berlin government coalition of Social Democrats, Greens, and The Left. The idea for an office for "immigrants" rather than "foreigners" in Berlin had been suggested by the city’s Green party as early as 2014.

The renaming was criticised by a Christian Democrat opposition politician as not what immigrants needed, and by one immigrant as "lipstick on a pig".

Responsibilities 

The Office has six divisions and 25 subdivisions (as of 2021):

  A – Asylum
  B – Special tasks
  E – Immigration
  R – Crime and repatriation
  G – Guiding principles and cross-sectional matters
  P – Process and service

Its service has been criticised by many users as unfriendly, German-only, and non-digitised, much like the former Ausländerbehörde.

Sites 
The Office has a main building at Friedrich-Krause-Ufer in Moabit and a second building at Keplerstraße in Charlottenburg, opened in 2016. Clients are directed to either of the two centres based on the type of visa or residency status they need or hold.

External links 

References 

2020 establishments in Germany
Immigration to the European Union